Aqar-e Sofla (also Romanized as Aqar-e Soflá; also known as ‘Aqar-e Pā’īn) is a village in Fariman Rural District, in the Central District of Fariman County, Razavi Khorasan Province, Iran. At the 2006 census, its population was 20, in 5 families.

See also 

 List of cities, towns and villages in Razavi Khorasan Province

References 

Populated places in Fariman County